The 1993 NCAA Division I Men's Basketball Championship Game took place on April 5, 1993 between the North Carolina Tar Heels and Michigan Wolverines at the Louisiana Superdome in New Orleans, Louisiana. The match-up was the final one of the fifty-fifth consecutive NCAA Men's Division I Basketball Championship single-elimination tournament — commonly referred to as the NCAA Tournament — organized by the National Collegiate Athletic Association (NCAA) and is used to crown a national champion for men's basketball at the Division I level.

The Tar Heels won their third NCAA Men's Basketball National Championship, after having been victorious in 1957 and 1982 beforehand. Donald Williams was named the NCAA basketball tournament Most Outstanding Player for his efforts throughout the tournament.

Background

Michigan Wolverines

West
Michigan (1) 84, Coastal Carolina (16) 53
Michigan 86, UCLA (9) 84 (OT)
Michigan 72, George Washington (12) 64
Michigan 77, Temple (7) 62
Final Four
Michigan 81, Kentucky (1) 78 (OT)

North Carolina Tar Heels

East
North Carolina (1) 85, East Carolina (16) 65
North Carolina 112, Rhode Island (8) 67
North Carolina 80, Arkansas (4) 74
North Carolina 75, Cincinnati (2) 68 (OT)
Final Four
North Carolina 78, Kansas (2) 68

Team rosters

Media coverage

Michigan and North Carolina were portrayed as different playing styles, with Michigan having an "NBA–style" roster and Carolina having "the model college system." Kansas center Eric Pauley, who played both teams, stated that Michigan was "really athletic," while North Carolina is "fundamentally sound." In addition, Michigan was known for allowing freshman to get significant playing time, while also allowing their players to be more "flamoboyant" and expressive. With respect to the sophomores on the Michigan roster, coach Smith said he was "amazed at what they had done" and mentioned how they had been to two Final Fours in as many years, further stating "that's a lifetime." The Tar Heels, on the other hand, were known for being a program where upperclassmen get more of the publicity and playing time. Montross commented on North Carolina's perception and related it to how Dean Smith "won't settle for anything but the image he has," while referencing their clean shaven appearance, proper dress attire when traveling and going to dinners, and their "[doing] everything just right.

Dean Smith, who had only one national championship to his credit from 1982, was viewed to have needed the game for his legacy as it would "shut up" critics. In addition, it would bring the Tar Heels to the forefront after Duke having won the previous two national championships. Meanwhile, Steve Fisher, was thought to have needed to win the title in order to vindicate to critics that he "can coach." He had previously won a national title in 1989 when he gained control of Michigan's team before the start of the NCAA Tournament. In advance of the game Smith spoke of Wolverines saying "They're quick, and Coach Fisher has done a great job getting the ball inside. They know how to pass and catch it."

As the two teams met in December in the Rainbow Classic, most media commented on the game and influenced their expectations. It was noted that the game would be different as Michigan's Jackson would be expected to play more than the minute he did in December before he left the game with a dislocated shoulder. Coach Smith felt Michigan relied on Jackson defensively and noted that he has been doing well on offense as of late. Mark Rosner of Austin American–Statesman wrote that North Carolina was performing much better on offense than they were in that December matchup.

Writers noted that Howard, Eric Reilly, and Webber would likely rotate on the seven–footer Montross, but Webber has the "brawn" to go against Montross. In regards to facing off and defending Montross, Webber stated "I'm not afraid of anyone." Montross spoke of Webber and his matchup saying that "Blocking shots is going to happen. He's got me. I got him." Rose was thought to have a great performance as he would need to minimize his turnovers.

Starting lineups

Game summary

Source:

  

North Carolina led 72-67 with a minute left.  After Ray Jackson hit a jumper with 46 seconds left to make it a three-point game, the Wolverines called their final timeout.  On the Tar Heels' inbounds pass, Brian Reese stepped out of bounds, turning the ball over to Michigan.  Jalen Rose missed a three-pointer that would have tied the game, but Chris Webber got the rebound and scored with 36 seconds remaining, bringing the Wolverines within one.  Pat Sullivan was fouled with 20 seconds left.  He made the front end of a one-and-one and was given a second free throw, which he missed.  Webber rebounded for the Wolverines, who were down by two points and out of timeouts.  Webber traveled, but none of the officials saw it.  He then made a more costly mistake—with 11 seconds left, he called a timeout, even though Michigan had no timeouts left, meaning that North Carolina would have two free throws and then possession of the ball.  Donald Williams made both free throws, giving North Carolina a 75-71 lead.  With 8 seconds left, Williams was fouled, and hit both free throws for the final points of the game.  Rose then missed a three-pointer, which would not have mattered—even if he had made it, the clock would have run out.  North Carolina won by the final score of 77-71.

References

Footnotes

Citations

NCAA Division I Men's Basketball Championship Game
NCAA Division I Men's Basketball Championship Games
Michigan Wolverines men's basketball
North Carolina Tar Heels men's basketball
Basketball competitions in New Orleans
College sports tournaments in Louisiana
NCAA Division I Men's Basketball Championship Game
NCAA Division I Basketball Championship Game, 1993
NCAA Division I Basketball Championship Game